Marguerite is a French/Czech/Belgian 2015 comedy and drama film directed by Xavier Giannoli and written by Giannoli and Marcia Romano, loosely inspired by the life of Florence Foster Jenkins. Set in the Golden Twenties, the film stars Catherine Frot as a wealthy woman who is an enthusiastic amateur singer and believes, wrongly, that she has a beautiful voice. The film is an international co-production among France, the Czech Republic, and Belgium. Marguerite received eleven nominations at the 41st César Awards, winning for Best Actress, Best Costume Design, Best Sound, and Best Production Design.

Cast
 Catherine Frot as Marguerite Dumont
 André Marcon as Georges Dumont
 Denis Mpunga as Madelbos
 Michel Fau as Atos Pezzini / Divo
 Christa Theret as Hazel Klein
 Astrid Whettnall as Françoise Bellaire
 Sylvain Dieuaide as Lucien Beaumont
 Aubert Fenoy as Kyrill Von Priest
 Sophia Leboutte as Félicité La Barbue
 Théo Cholbi as Diego

Production
The film was shot in Prague from mid-September to early December 2014.

Release
Marguerite was screened in the main competition section of the 72nd Venice International Film Festival.

Critical response
The film was well received by the critics. Review aggregator Rotten Tomatoes gives the film an approval rating of 95%, based on 92 reviews, with an average rating of 7.5/10. The site's critical consensus reads, "Touching, funny, and thoughtful, Marguerite honors its real-life inspiration with a well-acted and ultimately inspirational look at the nature of art and the value of a dream." On Metacritic the film has a score of 76 out of 100, based on 25 critics, indicating "generally favorable reviews".

Screendaily described the film as "original, funny and touching". Jordan Mintzer of The Hollywood Reporter wrote that the film "offers up an amusingly entertaining portrait of fortune, infamy and severe melodic dysfunction". Cineuropa gave the film a positive review, and said that the director "has brought together the best of his sensitivity and attraction to characters that are passionate and obsessive to the extreme, to paint the portrait of an unusual woman, who Catherine Frot plays with stunning dramatic and comical genius".

Accolades

See also
 Florence Foster Jenkins, a 2016 British-French film starring Meryl Streep as Jenkins.

References

External links
 
 
 Marguerite at Cohen Media Group (U.S. Distributor)

2015 films
2010s French-language films
2015 comedy-drama films
French comedy-drama films
Czech comedy-drama films
Belgian comedy-drama films
French films based on actual events
Films directed by Xavier Giannoli
Films set in Paris
Films set in 1921
Films set in the 1920s
Films shot in the Czech Republic
Tragicomedy films
Films featuring a Best Actress Lumières Award-winning performance
Films featuring a Best Actress César Award-winning performance
2015 comedy films
2010s French films